The Letlhakane diamond mine is a diamond mine located in Botswana about  west of the city of Francistown. Letlhakane, meaning "little reeds", is owned by Debswana, a partnership between the De Beers company and the government of Botswana. It is the second oldest of four mines operated by the company, having begun operations in 1975.

Letlhakane is of open pit construction. In 2003, the mine produced 1.06 million carats (212 kg) of diamond. The recoverable ore grade at the mine was about 0.26 carats (52 mg) per ton. The ore produced at Letlhakane used to be processed at a processing plant at its sister mine, Orapa diamond mine, about  distant. The Letlhakane mine is also managed from the Orapa mine.

In 2015, over 2.1 million tons per year of ore was mined, and over 2.3 million tons was treated, resulting in 583,000 carats of diamond.

Ceasing Open Pit Operations

As of 2017, the Letlhakane Mine ceased open pit operations and completed a plant for the processing of tailings. This is expected to extend the life of the operations at this facility until 2043.

References

Diamond mines in Botswana
Open-pit mines
Surface mines in Botswana